Anarkali is a rapid transit station serving the Orange Line of the Lahore Metro in Lahore, Pakistan. It is one of the two underground stations on the Orange Line.

History 
The Anarkali station was opened after the completion and inauguration of the Orange Line on 25 October 2020. The construction of the station is reported to have displaced a large number of people, and caused damage to a number of community and heritage sites.

Etymology
The Anarkali station serves the Anarkali Bazaar, which is one of the oldest surviving markets in the Indian Subcontinent, dating back at least 200 years. It derives its name from the nearby mausoleum thought to be that of a courtesan named Anārkalī, who was chased out of town by the order of the Mughal Emperor Akbar for having a love affair with his son, Prince Salīm, who later became Emperor Jahāngīr.

Station layout 
Anarkali station has different layout than most metro stations on the Orange Line. Its design is inspired by Islamic and Mughal architecture which have helped in transforming the station building into a landmark in the city centre. The station is located underground, and is 16 meters wide and 121.50 meters long.

Platform layout

Connections 
The Orange line connects to the Lahore Metrobus via an underground walkway from the Anarkali Station of the Orange Line to MAO College Station of the Lahore Metrobus.

See also 
 Lahore Metrobus
 Orange Line (Lahore Metro)
 Lahore Metro
 Transport in Lahore

References 

Transport in Lahore
China–Pakistan Economic Corridor
Railway stations opened in 2020
Lahore Metro stations